Fernandópolis is a municipality in the state of São Paulo, Brazil. The population is 69,402 (2020 est.) in an area of 550 km2. Fernandópolis is the center of the microregion of Fernandópolis with 104,623 inhabitants and area of 2,811.7 km2.

History

The beginning of the city has relation with the cattle creation in the region and the opening of a "cow road" (Estrada Boiadeira) in the beginning of the 20th century. The coffee production in the region begins in 1917.

On November 30, 1944, the district was established and on January 1, 1945, the municipality of Fernandópolis was officially established with the emancipation from Tanabi.

Geography
Fernandópolis is located in the northwest of São Paulo state, 555 km from the city of São Paulo.

Economy

The Tertiary sector is the economic basis of Fernandópolis. Commerce, services and public administration corresponds to 69.6% of the city GDP. Industry is 26.7% of the GDP, and the Primary sector corresponds to 3.6%.

Culture

The city hosts an annual Expo, the Exposição de Fernandópolis, with Rodeo and other leisure options.

Demographics

Indicators
Population: 69,836 (IBGE/2017)
Area: 550.0 km2 (212.4 sq mi)
Population density:  126.97/km2 (328.9/sq mi)
Urbanization: 96.9% (2010)
Sex ratio (Males to Females): 94.77 (2011)
Birth rate: 10.10/1,000 inhabitants (2009)
Infant mortality: 7.69/1,000 births (2009)
HDI: 0.832 (UNDP/2000)

All indicators are from SEADE and IBGE

Sports

The city has a professional football team, the Fernandópolis Futebol Clube.

References

 
1945 establishments in Brazil
Populated places established in 1945